Aim in Life is a Bangladeshi drama serial produced by Kazi Riton, written and directed by Masud Sezan. This drama serial aired on NTV, and was first aired on June 14, 2008 and last aired on January 15, 2009. The story revolves around the city dwellers of Dhaka, and how everyone manages to lead their lives, disregarding their status. This dramaserial stars Mosharraf Karim, Kusum Sikder, Rawnak Hasan, Tisha, Rifat Chowdhury, Challenger, Tinni, Nafisa Jahan, Kochi Khandokar, Saju Muntasher, Nafa, Abdullah Rana, Shirin Alam, Tareq Mahmud, Daud Rony and Ujjal. There are also cameo appearances from the former captain of Bangladesh National Cricket Team, Khaled Mashud, singer S I Tutul and Magician Jewel Aich.

Plot
The story revolves around a retired government officer, his family, his house, and also the tenants of the house. who slowly starts to realise that he has a lot on his hand after his retirement to write a book titled "Aim in Life." Irritated by the actions of his own offspring, he comes to the realisation that it's a must for every individual to have an aim in life. He wants to explain this in his book. Looking for material for his book, he starts fieldwork by interviewing people. Interviewees includes even beggars, whether they have an aim or not.

Characters
 Mosharraf Karim
 Kusum Sikder
 Challenger
 Raunak Hasan
 Tisha
 Rifat Chowdhury
 Nafisa Jahan - Shumi
 Kochi Khandokar
 Saju Muntasher
 Nafa
 Abdullah Rana
 Shirin Alam
 Tareq Mahmud
 Daud Rony
 Ujjal
 deepanshu teotia jaat

References

2008 Bangladeshi television series debuts
2009 Bangladeshi television series endings
2000s Bangladeshi television series
Bangladeshi drama television series
Bengali-language television programming in Bangladesh
NTV (Bangladeshi TV channel) original programming